The 1951 Central Michigan Chippewas football team represented Central Michigan College of Education, renamed Central Michigan University in 1959, in the Interstate Intercollegiate Athletic Conference (IIAC) during the 1951 college football season. In their first season under head coach Kenneth Kelly, the Chippewas compiled a 5–3 record (4–2 against IIAC opponents) and outscored all opponents by a combined total of 231 to 158.

The team's statistical leaders included quarterback Andy MacDonald with 1,560 passing yards, halfback Dave Clark with 301 rushing yards, and Porter Lewis with 272 receiving yards. Six Central Michigan players (McDonald, Clark, guard Loren Dietrich, halfback Dick Flewelling, tackle Jim Schultz, and guard Tom Weede) received first-team honors on the All-IIAC team.

Coach Kelly was hired by Central Michigan in March 1951. A native of Mt. Pleasant, Michigan, Kelly was a Central Michigan alumnus who had won a school record 13 varsity letters in football, basketball, tennis, and baseball.  He had been the athletic director and head football and basketball coach at Saginaw Arthur Hill High School for nine years.

Schedule

References

Central Michigan
Central Michigan Chippewas football seasons
Central Michigan Chippewas football